Glauberman is a surname. Notable people with the surname include:

 Dana E. Glauberman (born 1968), American film editor
 George Glauberman (born 1941), American mathematician